Lincoln Island is a wooded island in Lynn Canal in Alaska, United States. It is part of the Juneau City and Borough. The first European to sight the island was Joseph Whidbey, master of   during George Vancouver's 1791–1795 expedition, in 1794. It was named in 1868 by Commander R. W. Meade, USN, presumably for Abraham Lincoln.

References

Islands of the Alexander Archipelago
Islands of Juneau, Alaska
Islands of Alaska